Splendrillia obscura is a species of sea snail, a marine gastropod mollusk in the family Drilliidae.

Description

Distribution
This species occurs in the demersal zone off the Naska and Sala-i-Gomes Ridges, Southeast Pacific Ocean, at depths between 230 m and 750 m.

References

  Tucker, J.K. 2004 Catalog of recent and fossil turrids (Mollusca: Gastropoda). Zootaxa 682:1–1295.

External links

obscura
Gastropods described in 1990